Hemchandra may refer to:
 Hemchandra Barua (1836–1897), writer, lexicographer and social reformer
 Hem Barua (Tyagbir) or Hemchandra Barua (1893–1945), writer, freedom fighter, social worker
 Hem Barua (1915–1977), Parliamentarian, Socialist leader, writer, poet, historian and Educationist

See also
 Hemchandra Goswami (1872–1928), writer, poet, historian, Principal of and a linguist from Assam